Amel is a Belgian municipality in the Walloon province of Liège, and is part of the German-speaking Community of Belgium. On January 1, 2013, the municipality of Amel had a total population of 5,466. The total area is 125.15 km² which gives a population density of 44 inhabitants per km².

There are eighteen villages in Amel: Amel (village), Born, Deidenberg, Eibertingen, Halenfeld, Heppenbach, Hepscheid, Herresbach, Iveldingen, Medell, Meyerode, Mirfeld, Möderscheid, Montenau, Schoppen, Stephanshof, Valender and Wereth.

The name Amel is of Celtic origin and means water. The river Amblève flows through the municipality.

Amel is the birthplace of Karl-Heinz Lambertz, current leader (Minister-President) of the community executive of the  German-speaking community of Belgium.

History
In 716, the Battle of Amblève, between Charles Martel with the Austrasians on one side and the joint forces of the Frisians and Neustrians under Ragenfrid and Chilperic II on the other side, was the first victory for Charles Martel.

Amel was the site of heavy fighting during the Battle of the Bulge. On 17 December 1944, the Wereth Massacre took place when eleven soldiers of the African American 333rd Field Artillery Battalion were tortured and executed by members of the 1st SS Panzer Division Leibstandarte SS Adolf Hitler. A memorial to the Wereth 11 was erected in the village in 1994.

Sports
The municipality's football club, KFC Grün-Weiß Amel, play in the Liège Provincial League first tier (sixth tier overall).

See also
 List of protected heritage sites in Amel

References

External links
 
 Gazetteer Entry
 Municipality of Amel website (German)

 
Municipalities of Liège Province